Macologist.org was a website on gaming on the Apple Macintosh platforms.  Macologist specializes in technical support issues as well as the conversion and hosting of mods for first-person shooter games such as Unreal Tournament 2004, Battlefield 1942, Call of Duty, Homeworld 2, and Doom 3.  The site also has a Mac gaming news section as well as a reviews section for both retail games and mods. The site was launched in June 2004.

Currently the site appears to have gone offline as of 2010. As of March, 2018, the domain has been acquired for a site that alleges mental benefits for drug use.

Outside impact
By the end of 2005, Macologist had been cited three times in MacAddict magazine.  In May 2005, Macworld, the other major US Macintosh print magazine, incorporated the Macologist-developed Santaduck Toolpak, a benchmarking utility for the game Unreal Tournament 2004, into its benchmarking suite.  In September 2004, the Santaduck Toolpak was also cited by Apple Computer upon the introduction of its first revision iMac G5, is also used by the benchmarking sites barefeats.com   and xlr8yourmac.com, and received an Honorable Mention award in the NVIDIA-Epic Make Something Unreal contest.  Both the tools as well as several mod download URLs are also listed at the Apple website. One of the hosts of the Mac Games Radio podcast is featured as a Macologist editor.

Macologist reviews and technical benchmarking articles have also been cited by some game developers.  For example, for the game Doom 3, the Macintosh version's publisher Aspyr Media's website refers users to a link at Macologist for optimization questions, as does their technical support staff.  The Feral Interactive website also lists several links to Macologist reviews, for example for Chessmaster 9000 .

Macologist in London, United Kingdom (macologist.co.uk) is an independent Apple Repair and Mac Support specialist not affiliated with Apple or macologist.org.

References

Video game platform websites
Macintosh websites
Internet properties established in 2004